New Traditionalists is the fourth studio album by the American new wave band Devo, released on August 26, 1981, by Warner Bros. Records. The album was recorded over a period of four months between December 1980 and April 1981, at the Power Station, in Manhattan, New York City. It features the minor hits "Through Being Cool" and "Beautiful World".

Background
Devo devised the album's title while touring their Freedom of Choice album in Japan. The group had met two businessmen in a sushi bar who were wearing pins that read "New Traditionalists". Mark Mothersbaugh recalled that the band were inspired by the phrase, as they wanted to create new traditions themselves. The phrase belonged to a right-wing political group in Japan, who were using it as their name, and Devo found the pins in stores and purchased them as a joke. When the album was being written, the group recalled the name and decided that it would work for their songs. In the words of Gerald Casale, "We became the New Traditionalists but turned it on its ear. We appropriated the idea of that, meaning we were going to provide you with new traditions to forget about the old ones".

Composition
Following the band's success with "Whip It" and its parent album, Freedom of Choice, Devo opted to craft a darker and less accessible album that explored their concept of "de-evolution" even further. New Traditionalists contains songs in a minimalist synth-pop style, with an emphasis on synthesizer riffs and dance rhythms, as well as an increased focus on electronic percussion. Lyrically, the album contains more straightforward sentiments than the band's previous albums, often eschewing sarcasm and irony for overt anger. Rolling Stone Australia notes that the song "Beautiful World" "waits a while to reveal its hidden darkness and cynicism", echoed in its music video, which starts out "happy" and "optimistic". In "Enough Said", Devo make one of their first overtly political statements, advocating throwing leaders into a ring and letting them "fight like hell to see who's king". The lyrics were written by Mark and Bob's father Robert Mothersbaugh, Sr., who also played their character General Boy.

According to music historian Andy Zax, New Traditionalists found Devo "more than slightly ambivalent about their newfound popularity", exemplified in opening track "Through Being Cool", with its criticism of trendy "ninnies" and "twits". Zax also observed that songs such as "Jerkin' Back 'n' Forth" and "Love Without Anger" "dissect dysfunctional relationships from the inside, rather than from afar".

In a 2020 interview, Gerald Casale stated that he felt New Traditionalists "was the last [Devo] record where there was some semblance of balance between primal energy and just electronics for their own sake."

Production
New Traditionalists was the band's first fully self-produced album. It was recorded on a then-new brand of 2-inch tape from 3M. Unfortunately, when Devo began recording the vocals for the album, the edges of the tape had begun to disintegrate. After asking Warner Bros. if they could start over and re-record the album from scratch and being denied, Devo transferred all the work they had done to digital reel-to-reel tape and finished the album via digital recording at the Record Plant in Los Angeles, California.

"The Super Thing" was later sampled in Devo's 2007 single "Watch Us Work It", which was remixed by Teddybears.

Artwork
The front and back cover were photographed by Moshe Brakha and feature artwork by Richard Seireeni, based on a concept by the band. The band's clothing, also worn during live performances, was influenced by Japanese fashion, while the rubber pompadours, created by Brent Scrivner, were based on the hairstyle of John F. Kennedy but were frequently mistaken for that of Ronald Reagan. Casale's longheld interest in the space program led to the band using a cartoon image of an astronaut's head from a paper Halloween mask in the artwork, which was later reused for the limited edition "Beautiful World" picture disc.

The band wore blue V-neck T-shirts with the New Traditionalists astronaut on the black sleeves. This shirt can be seen on the US, Australian and New Zealand versions of the album cover. On the European cover, Devo is seen wearing "Sleeveless Maxi-Turtleneck Sweaters". The T-shirts, turtlenecks and plastic versions of the pompadours were all available through Devo's fan club catalog.

The first pressings of the LP included a 33 inch by 22 inch poster, designed by the Church of the SubGenius. It contains a drawing of the band on stage, with some iconic American archetypes (a Native American, a Pilgrim, a cowboy, a hippie, a punk rocker and a modern housewife) in the audience.

Promotion

Music videos
Devo made three music videos for the album. "Through Being Cool" had Devo taking a limited role, focusing on a team of kids clad in Devo "Action Vests" attacking arrogant and ignorant people with "spudguns".

In "Love Without Anger", Devo acts as a Greek chorus to a bizarre love story between two humanoid chickens. It also features a stop motion video by Rev. Ivan Stang (Church of the SubGenius) of Barbie and Ken fighting each other and removing each other's body parts. A portrait of J. R. "Bob" Dobbs is on the wall above the couch.

The music video for the song "Beautiful World" features the character Booji Boy prominently, as he initially watches scenes of beautiful women, futuristic cars and other happy elements, which by the end of the song have been replaced by images of race riots, the Ku Klux Klan, World War I, famine in Africa, car crashes and nuclear explosions, which puts a much darker slant on the song's lyrics. The video was slightly censored for broadcasts on the ABC-TV music show Countdown. A small segment of archive footage depicting a woman on fire was considered unsuitable for the show's early evening time slot—despite the fact that the flames were animated, not real—and this censored version is still screened occasionally on the ABC's music video series rage, including a mid-1990s episode hosted by Devo.

"Working in the Coal Mine"
New Traditionalists was originally packaged with a bonus 7-inch single of the band's cover of Lee Dorsey's "Working in the Coal Mine".

According to a 2008 interview with lead singer Mark Mothersbaugh, Devo had originally intended to include the song on the album but were thwarted by Warner Bros. The band was then approached by the makers of the animated film Heavy Metal and asked if they had a song to donate for a sequence in the film involving a house band in outer space. Devo offered them the unused "Working in the Coal Mine", and as a fluke the song ended up being the only charting song on the soundtrack album. Since the song was now a "hit", Warner Bros. pressed up thousands of two-sided 7-inch singles and included them with initial copies of the LP. 

Most CD and cassette pressings of New Traditionalists include "Working in the Coal Mine" as a bonus track.

Reception

Critical
David Fricke of Rolling Stone stated, "New Traditionalists has a few obvious Top Forty finger poppers – 'Through Being Cool' (the latest Devo fight song), 'Jerkin' Back 'n' Forth' and 'Enough Said' (this year's 'Whip It') – and the slick production makes it all go down easy. But the group's increasing overuse of simplistic, droning synthesizer riffs and treadmill dance rhythms is neither trendy nor traditional. It's predictable." Robert Christgau of The Village Voice called the album "Filler plus three major songs" ("Through Being Cool", "Love Without Anger" and "Beautiful World") "each of which gets an explanatory video in concert, which with these art-school ciphers is a comfort", although he concluded that these "would not satisfy the ninnies and twits who think war toys and visual aids are evil by definition." Scott Isler of Trouser Press stated that while New Traditionalists had "a couple of attention-getting songs ('Love Without Anger,' 'Going Under,' the extraordinarily attractive 'Beautiful World')" as well as the bonus "Working in the Coal Mine" single, the majority of the album was "clinical-sounding laissez-faire techno-dance stuff, less-than-compelling lyrics set to a metronomic 4/4 beat."

In a retrospective review for AllMusic, Steve Huey opined that New Traditionalists found Devo "aghast at being pegged as a novelty act by some of their own satirical targets", and that the band "largely abandons its sense of absurdity" on the album, theorizing that they'd decided that "America's comprehension of irony was sorely lacking". While he felt the album contained "some of Devo's angriest, most embittered songs", he felt many were "unmemorable" and sported "melodic deficiencies", although he ultimately concluded that "at least half of the album is worthwhile."

Commercial
New Traditionalists was slightly less successful than the Freedom of Choice album, peaking at No. 23 on the Billboard charts, whereas Freedom of Choice had peaked at No. 22. The non-album single "Working in the Coal Mine" peaked at No. 43 on the Billboard Hot 100.

The album and its singles continued Devo's success in Australia, with "Beautiful World" peaking at No. 14 and "Working in the Coal Mine" at No. 20.

Track listing

Additional tracks

Personnel
Credits adapted from Pioneers Who Got Scalped: The Anthology CD liner notes:

Devo
Mark Mothersbaugh – vocals, keyboards, guitar
Gerald Casale – vocals, bass guitar, keyboards
Bob Mothersbaugh – lead guitar, vocals
Bob Casale – rhythm guitar, keyboards, vocals
Alan Myers – drums

Credits adapted from the original album's liner notes:

Technical
Devo – producer, design concept 
Phil Brown – mastering
Larry Alexander – engineer
Karat Faye – assistant engineer
Brent Scrivner – New Traditionalist hairdos
John Zabrucky – New Traditionalist astronaut
Moshe Brakha – cover photography
Richard Seireeni – art direction
Fran Fresquez (Narf Graphics) – Club Devo catalog

Tour 
The tour set was designed by Mark Mothersbaugh and Gerald Casale, and was manufactured by John Zabrucky. Modified treadmills were housed inside a temple stage set, allowing for uniform choreography by the band members, and still photos were projected behind the band. The set was plexiglass, allowing it to be illuminated by different colored lights, and the front, made of white plastic, was removable, revealing a framework.

On stage, Devo wore what were called "Utopian Boy Scout Uniforms", consisting of a gray button down shirt, gray slacks and black patent leather shoes. Professional footage was shot during the tour, but after the film crew's lighting generator clashed with the stage crew's and blew both sets of lights, an insurance claim stipulated that the footage had to be destroyed. However, Devo appeared on the TV show Fridays in 1981 and performed five songs with a full stage set, and a few short, semi-pro-shot clips from the tour have surfaced over the Internet. Several audio bootlegs of the tour are also available, varying in quality.

In 2012, Devo commemorated the New Traditionalists tour by releasing Live 1981 Seattle as a double LP for Record Store Day. The album was culled from a cassette recording from November 1981. According to Gerald Casale, "DEVO archivist Michael Pilmer (aka Devo-Obsesso), found the tape in a shoebox full of cassettes in [keyboardist and guitarist] Bob 2's home fifteen years ago, which he immediately transferred to DAT". In 2013, it was issued on CD with two bonus tracks from a performance at the Orpheum Theatre in Boston, Massachusetts on November 5, 1981.

Setlist
"Nutra Theme"
"Going Under"
"Through Being Cool"
"Jerkin' Back 'n' Forth"
"Soft Things"
"Pity You"
"Freedom of Choice Theme" (Only performed during the second leg)
"Whip It"
"Girl U Want"
"Planet Earth"
"Race of Doom"
"Super Thing"
"Uncontrollable Urge"
"Mongoloid"
"Jocko Homo"
"Smart Patrol/Mr. DNA"
"Gut Feeling"
"Gates of Steel"
"Beautiful World"
"Working in the Coal Mine"
"Devo Corporate Anthem"

Charts

Weekly charts

Year-end charts

Certifications

Bibliography

References

External links
 

Devo albums
1981 albums
Warner Records albums
Synth-pop albums by American artists